William Hendrik Dominicus Suringar (1805–1895) was a Dutch philanthropist who established the Netherlands Mettray, the equivalent of the French Mettray Penal Colony.

Selected publications
My Visit to Mettray in 1845: A Speech

References

External links 

List of works by William Suringar

Dutch philanthropists
Prison reformers
1805 births
1895 deaths
19th-century philanthropists